Alonzo Menifield (born October 18, 1987) is an American mixed martial artist currently competing in the Light Heavyweight division of the Ultimate Fighting Championship (UFC). A professional since 2015, he has formerly fought in Bellator and the Legacy Fighting Alliance.

Background
Menifield was born in Los Angeles, California. After his father passed away, his mother raised him and his brother until the age of 14 when the boys were put in foster care. Menifield bounced around between 12 different foster homes. Menifield attended Canyon High School for only two years, but graduated and excelled at football. Menifield continued his football career at NJCAA Glendale Community College (California), where he starred as primarily a linebacker and was an Honorable Mention All-American his sophomore year as well as a member of the track and field team. After his first two seasons at Glendale, Menifield earned a scholarship to Texas A&M University–Commerce where he graduated with a degree in Criminal Justice. Menifield later played football professionally in both the CFL and Arena Football League.

Mixed martial arts career

Early career
Menifield made his MMA debut at heavyweight against Zach Rosol on November 20, 2015 at Bellator 146. He won the fight via TKO in the first round.

Menifield then moved to light heavyweight and won his next two fights via TKO and KO before fighting in Dana White's Contender Series.

Dana White's Contender Series
Menifield faced UFC veteran Daniel Jolly on July 25, 2017 at Dana White's Contender Series 3. He won the fight via TKO at the end of round one due to an eye injury but failed to secure a contract with the UFC.

Menifield was provided with a second chance against Dashawn Boatwright on June 16, 2018 at Dana White's Contender Series 9. He won via TKO with ground on pound strikes within the first 8 seconds of the first round and was awarded with a UFC contract.

Ultimate Fighting Championship
Menifield made his UFC debut on January 19, 2019 against Vinicius Moreira at UFC Fight Night: Cejudo vs. Dillashaw. He won the fight via TKO with punches in round one.

Menifield then faced Paul Craig on June 29, 2019 at UFC on ESPN: Ngannou vs. dos Santos. He won the fight via KO with punches in round one.

Menifield then faced Devin Clark on June 6, 2020 at UFC 250. He lost the fight via unanimous decision.

Menifield was scheduled to face Ovince Saint Preux on August 22, 2020 at UFC on ESPN 15. Just hours before the event was scheduled to begin, it was announced that the bout was canceled due to Saint Preux testing positive for COVID-19. The bout eventually took place on September 5, 2020 at UFC Fight Night 176. Menifield lost the fight via knockout in the second round.

Menifield was expected to face William Knight on February 27, 2021 at UFC Fight Night 186. However, the bout was postponed during the week leading up to the event after Menifield testing positive for COVID-19. The pairing was expected to be left intact and rescheduled for UFC 260. This time Knight was removed due to COVID-19 protocols and was replaced by promotional newcomer Fabio Cherant. At the weight-ins, Cherant weighted 206.5 pounds, half a pound over the non-title light heavyweight limit. The bout proceeded at a catchweight and he was fined 20% of his individual purse, which went to his opponent Menifield. Menifield won the fight via Von Flue choke in round one.

Menifield faced Ed Herman on August 7, 2021 at UFC 265. He won the fight via unanimous decision.

Menifield was scheduled to face William Knight on February 27, 2021 at UFC Fight Night 186. However, the bout was postponed during the week leading up to the event after Menifield testing positive for COVID-19. The pairing was expected to be left intact and rescheduled for UFC 260. This time Knight was removed due to COVID-19 protocols. The pair was rescheduled to December 4, 2021 at UFC on ESPN 31. Menifield lost the fight via unanimous decision.

Menifield was scheduled to face Nicolae Negumereanu on June 4, 2022, at UFC Fight Night 207. However, Negumereanu was removed from the event for undisclosed reasons and he was replaced by Askar Mozharov. Menifield won the fight via technical knockout in the first round.

Menifield faced Misha Cirkunov on October 15, 2022, at UFC Fight Night 212. He won the fight via knockout in round one.

Menifield faced Jimmy Crute on February 12, 2023, at UFC 284. After a point deduction in the third round due to Menifield grabbing the fence, the fight ended in a majority draw.

Personal life
Menifield is married and has two sons; Alonzo Jr., and Xavier.

Championships and accomplishments
Ultimate Fighting Championship
Performance of the Night (One Time)

Mixed martial arts record

|-
|Draw
|align=center|
|Jimmy Crute
|Draw (majority)
|UFC 284
|
|align=center|3
|align=center|5:00
|Perth, Australia 
|
|-
|Win
|align=center|13–3
|Misha Cirkunov
|KO (punches)
|UFC Fight Night: Grasso vs. Araújo
|
|align=center|1
|align=center|1:28
|Las Vegas, Nevada, United States
|
|-
|Win
|align=center|12–3
|Askar Mozharov
|TKO (elbows)
|UFC Fight Night: Volkov vs. Rozenstruik
|
|align=center|1
|align=center|4:40
|Las Vegas, Nevada, United States
|
|-
|Loss
|align=center|11–3
|William Knight
|Decision (unanimous)
|UFC on ESPN: Font vs. Aldo 
|
|align=center|3
|align=center|5:00
|Las Vegas, Nevada, United States
|  
|-
|Win
|align=center|11–2
|Ed Herman
|Decision (unanimous)
|UFC 265 
|
|align=center|3
|align=center|5:00
|Houston, Texas, United States
|
|-
|Win
|align=center|10–2
|Fabio Cherant
|Submission (shoulder choke)
|UFC 260 
|
|align=center|1
|align=center|1:11
|Las Vegas, Nevada, United States
|
|-
|Loss
|align=center|9–2
|Ovince Saint Preux
|KO (punch)
|UFC Fight Night: Overeem vs. Sakai
|
|align=center|2
|align=center|4:07
|Las Vegas, Nevada, United States
|
|-
|Loss
|align=center|9–1
|Devin Clark
|Decision (unanimous)
|UFC 250
|
|align=center|3
|align=center|5:00
|Las Vegas, Nevada, United States
|
|-
|Win
|align=center|9–0
|Paul Craig
|KO (punches)
|UFC on ESPN: Ngannou vs. dos Santos
|
|align=center|1
|align=center|3:19
|Minneapolis, Minnesota, United States
|
|-
|Win
|align=center|8–0
|Vinicius Moreira
|TKO (punches)
|UFC Fight Night: Cejudo vs. Dillashaw
|
|align=center|1
|align=center|3:56
|Brooklyn, New York, United States
|
|-
|Win
|align=center|7–0
|Dashawn Boatwright
|TKO (punches)
|Dana White's Contender Series 9
|
|align=center|1
|align=center|0:08
|Las Vegas, Nevada, United States
|
|-
|Win
|align=center|6–0
|Brice Ritani-Coe
|Submission (rear-naked choke)
|LFA 33
|
|align=center|1
|align=center|2:41
|Dallas, Texas, United States
|
|-
|Win
|align=center|5–0
|José Otávio Lacerda
|TKO (punches)
|LFA 28
|
|align=center|2
|align=center|0:32
|Dallas, Texas, United States
|
|-
|Win
|align=center|4–0
|Daniel Jolly
|TKO (eye injury)
|Dana White's Contender Series 3
|
|align=center|1
|align=center|5:00
|Las Vegas, Nevada, United States
|
|-
|Win
|align=center|3–0
|Khadzhimurat Bestaev
|TKO (submission to punches)
|LFA 13
|
|align=center|1
|align=center|4:01
|Burbank, California, United States
|
|-
|Win
|align=center|2–0
|Brock Combs
|KO (punches)
|RFA 43
|
|align=center|2
|align=center|0:22
|Broomfield, Colorado, United States
|
|-
|Win
|align=center|1–0
|Zach Rosol
|TKO (punches)
|Bellator 146
|
|align=center|1
|align=center|0:38
|Thackerville, Oklahoma, United States
|
|-

See also 
 List of current UFC fighters
 List of male mixed martial artists

References

External links 

 
 

1987 births
Living people
Light heavyweight mixed martial artists
Sportspeople from Dallas
Mixed martial artists from Texas
American male mixed martial artists
Ultimate Fighting Championship male fighters